Gleb Karpenko (born 27 October 2001) is an Estonian cyclist, who currently rides for Spanish Amateur team Vigo-Rias Baixas.

Major results
2018
 2nd Time trial, National Junior Road Championships
2019
 National Junior Road Championships
1st   Time trial
3rd Road race
 1st Overall Sint-Martinusprijs Kontich
1st Stage 3a (ITT)
 1st Stage 3 La Coupe du President de la Ville de Grudziądz
 5th Time trial, European Junior Road Championships
2020
 1st  Time trial, National Road Championships
2021
 2nd Road race, National Under-23 Road Championships
2022
 National Under-23 road championship
1st  Road race
2nd Time trial
 10th elite National Road Race Championships
 3rd Overall Orlen Nations Grand Prix

References

External links

2001 births
Living people
Estonian male cyclists
People from Narva-Jõesuu